Acoustic Live may refer to:

Acoustic Live (Erasure album)
Acoustic Live at the WOW, Floater 2008
Acoustic Live in Newcastle, album by Sting 1991
Acoustic: Live at Stubb's, album by Reckless Kelly
Acoustic Live Radio Show (EP), by 30 Seconds to Mars
Acoustic Live! (Adam Lambert EP)
Acoustic Live, Five for Fighting EP
Acoustic Live, Nils Lofgren 1997
Acoustic Live from the Gibson Lounge, an EP by Rev Theory
Southside Double-Wide: Acoustic Live, Sevendust

See also
Live Acoustic (disambiguation)
Live and Acoustic (disambiguation)